Adrian Bogucki (born 18 November 1999) is a Polish basketball player for Arka Gdynia of the Polish Basketball League. Standing at 2.15 m (7 ft 1 in), he plays as center.

Professional career
Bogucki started playing professionally for SMS PZKosz Władysławowo in 2015–16 season. He stayed with the club for three seasons and signed with Miasto Szkła Krosno in 2018. He signed with HydroTruck Radom in 2019. He was named the PLK Best Young Player and PLK Most Improved Player while playing with HydroTruck Radom, in 2019–20 season.

In July 2020, Bogucki signed with Anwil Włocławek.

On December 12, 2020, he has signed with Astoria Bydgoszcz of the Polish Basketball League.

On June 1, 2021, he has signed with Arka Gdynia of the Polish Basketball League.

References

External links
 Adrian Bogucki at eurobasket.com
 Adrian Bogucki at fiba.com
 Adrian Bogucki at plk.pl

Living people
1999 births
Asseco Gdynia players
Astoria Bydgoszcz players
Centers (basketball)
KK Włocławek players
KKK MOSiR Krosno players
Polish men's basketball players
Rosa Radom players